The Schweizerischer Studentenverein (Swiss Student's Society, abbreviation SSS; French: Société des Etudiants Suisses) is a society of colour bearing students of both genders and at the same time a federation of student corporations which are called sections. Its members are students and former students of high schools, universities and universities of applied sciences in Switzerland, Germany, Austria and Italy. Formerly, sections also existed in Belgium, France and in the Czech Republic. Its motto is virtus, scientia, amicitia!

History 
The SSS was founded on August 31, 1841, as the federation of the catholic-conservative, colour-bearing and non-duelling corporations of Switzerland. Its insignia are since 1851 a red-white-green ribbon and since 1861 a red hat. The member corporations are free to choose any shade of red and the type of hat. The first four sections were founded in 1843: GV Zähringia (in Fribourg), GV Suitia (in Schwyz), AV Semper Fidelis (Lucerne) and AV Helvetia Friburgensis (Freiburg im Breisgau).

There are not only sections in German-speaking regions but also in French speaking Switzerland and in other countries. Originally, the SSS was a political movement of catholic-conservative students and therefore implicitly the antipode of the Schweizerischer Zofingerverein, which had a progressive-liberal political setting. The SSS intended to gather Christian, conservative forces against liberalism and radicalism. Nevertheless, after the Sonderbund War of 1847 it were members of the SSS who contributed to Switzerlands unity.

The SSS always meant to be a society of politically active members. Nearly all members of the Swiss Federal Council of the CVP were members of the SSS. This orientation to catholic conservatism diminished more and more since 1970. Officially, the SSS is no longer affiliated to the CVP and nowadays open to other political parties.

In 1873, during the time of the Kulturkampf, the SSS became a society limited to Catholics. It was only in 1977 that this principle was changed to "christian". Consequently, the SSS is now also open to Protestants again. Since 1968 women are allowed to join the society, too.

The SSS has a friendship agreement with the CV and the OCV. It is a member of the EKV.

Organisation 
As of today, the SSS has 69 sections in Switzerland, Germany, Austria and Italy. This makes it the biggest society of colour-bearing students in Switzerland. It has 1100 active members and 7500 veterans.

The SSS was founded as a central society, not as a fusion of individual corporations which is why their members are directly members of the federation as well, including the right to vote. The supreme organ of the SSS is its General Assembly (consisting of all active members) which is held annually at the so-called Zentralfest ("central festival"), the biggest festival of colour-bearing students in Europe.

The General Assembly elects the five members of the Central Committee (CC), including the Central President (CP), the Central Actuary (CA), the Vice President (VCP), the ombudsman of the universities of applied science (FHCC) and the ombudsman of the high schools. The members are elected for one year; reelection is possible but not frequent. There are several permanent and temporary commissions to the support of the CC. The veterans are federated in the Altherrenbund (AHB), which has an own committee. The AHB and the CC are united in the Council of the SSS. Each member of the CC and the AHB has one vote – however, in case of equality of votes, the CC (as the committee of the students) prevails.

Member corporations 
In total, there are at least 113 corporations who were at least temporarily member of the SSS.

Sections with active and veteran members (58)

Sections without active but with veteran members (21)

Sections without active or veteran members (32)

Explanation

Notable members (selection)

Holy or blessed members 
 Maurice Tornay (1910–1949), Augustinian, missionary and martyr, (GV Agaunia)

Prelates 

 Norbert Brunner (born 1942), Bishop of Sion
 Benno Gut (1897–1970), Cardinal
 Kurt Koch (born 1950), Bishop of Basel
 Gaspard Mermillod (1824–1892), Cardinal
 Henri Schwery (1932–2021), Cardinal
 Reinhold Stecher (born 1921), Bishop of Innsbruck

Politicians

Members of the Swiss Federal Council 
 Viola Amherd (born 1962)
 Roger Bonvin (1907–1982)
 Enrico Celio (1889–1980)
 Flavio Cotti (born 1939)
 Alphons Egli (born 1924)
 Josef Escher (1885–1954)
 Philipp Etter (1891–1977)
 Kurt Furgler (1924–2008)
 Thomas Holenstein (1896–1962)
 Hans Hürlimann (1918–1994)
 Arnold Koller (born 1933)
 Doris Leuthard (born 1963) 
 Ruth Metzler (born 1964)
 Giuseppe Motta (1871–1940)
 Jean-Marie Musy (1876–1952)
 Ludwig von Moos (1910–1990)
 Josef Zemp (1834–1908)

Other politicians 
 Achille Casanova (born 1941)
 Anton Cottier (1943–2006)
 Dominique de Buman (born 1956)
 Bruno Frick (born 1953)
 Felix Gmür (born 1966)
 Carlo Schmid-Sutter (born 1950)
 Urs Schwaller (born 1952)

Others 

 Daniel Anrig (born 1972), Commandant of the Pontifical Swiss Guards
 Roman Bannwart (1919–2010), Theologian
  Pierre Hemmer (1950–2013), Entrepreneur
 Hans Küng (born 1928), Theologian
 Elmar Mäder (born 1963), Commandant of the Pontifical Swiss Guards
 Giusep Nay (born 1942), president of the Federal Supreme Court of Switzerland
 Michel Plancherel (1885–1967), Mathematician

Further reading 
 List of Swiss student societies
 Studentenverbindung

Literature 
 Sébastien Grüter: Histoire de la Société des Étudiants Suisses. Imprimerie de l'Œuvre de Saint-Paul, Fribourg, 1916
 Urs Altermatt (Editor): Den Riesenkampf mit dieser Zeit zu wagen… Schweizerischer Studentenverein 1841-1991. Maihof-Verlag, Lucerne, 1993,

External links 

 
 Schweizerischer Studentenverein
 Zentralfest des Schweizerischen Studentenvereins
 Postal cards of the SSS

References 

Christian fraternities and sororities in Switzerland
Fraternities and sororities in Switzerland
Student societies in Switzerland
1841 establishments in Switzerland

Student organizations established in 1841